Winkler Aerodrome  is a registered aerodrome located in the southeast part of Winkler, Manitoba, Canada.

References

Registered aerodromes in Manitoba
Winkler, Manitoba